Patrick Kearon (born 18 July 1961) has been a general authority of the Church of Jesus Christ of Latter-day Saints (LDS Church) since 2010 and a member of the Presidency of the Seventy since August 2017. On August 1, 2020, Kearon became the Senior President of the Seventy, becoming the first in this role to have been born outside the United States since the reconstitution of the Presidency of the Seventy in 1975.

Early life and biography
Kearon was born in Carlisle, England. He was partly raised in Saudi Arabia, where his father worked. He was baptized into the LDS Church on Christmas Eve 1987. He was introduced to the church when he stayed with an LDS family in California; two years later, he met LDS missionaries in London and began learning about the church. Kearon has worked in transportation, real estate and related fields.

LDS Church service
In the LDS Church, Kearon has been the president of the Bristol England Stake and an area seventy. Kearon delivered his first general conference address in October 2010 and spoke of being healed spiritually through the atonement of Jesus Christ.

At the time of his call as a general authority, Kearon was living in Clevedon, which is a town in North Somerset, England. In 2011, he was appointed as an Assistant Executive Director of the church's Priesthood and Media Services departments.  From August 2012 to August 2015, he served as a counselor in the presidency of the church's Europe Area, then becoming the area's president in August 2015. In May 2017, it was announced that Kearon would become a member of the Presidency of the Seventy on August 1, with responsibility for the church's North America Northwest and North America West areas.

Kearon became a very vocal leader on the topic of religious freedom, stating "Religious freedom means nothing if you protect your own religious practice while neglecting the practice of others, especially those who might be less secure and able to defend themselves. It only works if you protect the rights of everyone." In 2016 he addressed European Commission officials at a European Union summit asking for assistance during the refugee crisis. Kearon was quoted in a New York Times op-ed with regards to his work with refugees saying, “Their story is our story, not that many years ago.” While serving as president of the church's Europe Area, Kearon initiated programs to assist refugees in the area and also led out in the church working to support existing programs to help refugees..

Since August 1, 2020, Kearon has been serving as Senior President of the Seventy, becoming the first individual born outside of the United States to serve in this capacity.

Kearon has spoken in the general conference on several occasions.  In October 2010, he spoke on obedience, relating a story of how he was stung by a scorpion as a child after he disregarded his parents' instruction to wear shoes in the Arabian desert and elected to wear flip flops instead. In April 2016, he spoke of church members' efforts to help refugees. In April 2022, he spoke to those who have survived abuse, violence, or oppression.

Personal life
Kearon and his wife, Jennifer Carole Hulme, whom he met while she was studying in London as a Brigham Young University student, are the parents of four children. They were married in the Oakland California Temple.

References

External links
Patrick Kearon Official profile

1961 births
Converts to Mormonism
Members of the First Quorum of the Seventy (LDS Church)
Area seventies (LDS Church)
Living people
People from Somerset
English general authorities (LDS Church)
British expatriates in the United States
British expatriates in Saudi Arabia